Álvaro Antonio Elizalde Soto (born 15 October 1969) is a Chilean politician and lawyer.

He was minister of Michelle Bachelet. On 11 March 2022, he was elected President of the Senate in the LVI legislative period of the Chilean Congress.

References

External links
 Profile at BCN

1969 births
Living people
20th-century Chilean lawyers
21st-century Chilean politicians
Christian Left (Chile) politicians
University of Chile alumni
Socialist Party of Chile politicians
People from Talca
Chilean Ministers Secretary General of Government
Senators of the LV Legislative Period of the National Congress of Chile
Senators of the LVI Legislative Period of the National Congress of Chile
Presidents of the Senate of Chile